Keszü is a village in Baranya county, Hungary.

External links 
http://www.keszu.hu/ 

Populated places in Baranya County